Sony Pictures Kids Zone is the kids and family entertainment label of Sony Pictures Home Entertainment and the former record label owned by Sony Music Entertainment.

Despite the similarity in name, Sony Wonder is not directly related to the former Sony Wonder Technology Lab, an interactive technology and entertainment museum, although the museum was also owned by Sony.

History
Sony Music Video launched its Sony Kids' Music and Sony Kids' Video labels in February 1992 after months of planning under the banner SMV Children's Library. Artists signed to Sony Kids' Music at launch included Dan Crow, Tom Chapin, Tom Paxton, Kevin Roth, Rory, and Lois Young, who would all release product in the spring. After Sony Music Video dissolved in October, Sony Kids' Music and Video were coordinated and marketed through Epic Records beginning in January 1993. On May 22, 1993, Nickelodeon signed a long-term agreement with Epic Records as well.

On July 3, Sony Kids' Music and Video were merged as Sony Wonder; Sony Wonder's president Ted Green sought new strategic alliances like their one with Nickelodeon. On April 24, 1995, Children's Television Workshop entered a long-term agreement to distribute Sesame Street videos, music, and books through Sony Wonder, while Columbia Pictures began development on two Muppet films which would be released on video by Columbia TriStar Home Video. Sony Wonder also took over distribution of Random House Home Video titles, also during April. 

On July 29, Nickelodeon and Sony Wonder launched Nick Jr. Video with three titles based on Eureeka's Castle, Gullah Gullah Island, and Allegra's Window; an audio line launched on March 26, 1996. In 1996, two years after Viacom's acquisition of Paramount Communications, the owners of Paramount Pictures, Sony Wonder's deal with Nickelodeon expired, leaving Nickelodeon and Nick Jr. videos and DVDs to be distributed by Paramount Home Video (and CIC Video internationally until 1999).

On August 2, 1997, Sony Wonder entered a long-term worldwide joint venture with Together Again Video Productions to create and distribute new and previous Kidsongs titles, starting with 20 new episodes of The Kidsongs Television Show. On December 27, Sony Wonder and Golden Books Family Entertainment joined forces to release hit titles from Golden Books' catalog starting in spring 1998; the contract continued with Classic Media after they acquired Golden Books.

The company was also the distributor (in Canada only) for series produced by Cinar, such as Wimzie's House, Madeline, A Bunch of Munsch, The Busy World of Richard Scarry and Caillou.

On May 4, 1998, Sony Wonder bought Sunbow Entertainment, which had produced various shows based on Hasbro's toy lines but whose original programming had mostly under-performed. On October 3, 2000, German based company TV-Loonland AG acquired the Sunbow library along with Sony Wonder's other television business assets. As part of the deal, Sony kept the North American home video and international audio rights to its library. On May 14, 2008, Hasbro acquired the Sunbow programs based on its properties, which are now part of the eOne library.

In 2009, TV-Loonland filed for bankruptcy. In 2011, Loonland sold its catalogue to m4e AG. In February 2017, Studio 100 acquired a majority stake in m4e AG. Studio 100 currently holds the television rights to most of the Loonland catalogue, including Sunbow and Sony Wonder.

On March 13, 2007, Sony BMG announced that it was shutting down Sony Wonder to focus on its core music business. However, on June 20, 2007, it was announced that Sony Wonder became a division of Sony Pictures Home Entertainment as its kids’- and family-entertainment label. Classic Media's, Sesame Workshop's and Random House's video deals were sold to Genius Products for an undisclosed amount, and later to Vivendi Entertainment. The home media releases to Caillou were moved to Vivendi Entertainment Canada. Since 2012, Caillou DVDs are distributed by Entertainment One and after their purchase of Phase 4 Films in 2014, are released through the KaBoom Entertainment label. Sesame Workshop's properties were moved to Warner Home Video in 2010 following the closure of Genius Products. As of 2018, Sesame Workshop’s properties are currently distributed by Shout! Factory through the Shout! Factory Kids label.

In 2012, DreamWorks Animation acquired Classic Media for $155 million; the company became a unit of DreamWorks Animation and was renamed to DreamWorks Classics.
 
Universal Pictures Home Entertainment, is the current distributor for Classic Media’s properties after NBCUniversal acquired DreamWorks Animation in 2016.

In 2015, the Sony Wonder label was rebranded as Sony Pictures Family Fun, and was later folded and merged into Sony Pictures Kids Zone in 2020.

The Sony Wonder label was still used for the direct-to-video The Swan Princess film series up until the same year.

Notes and references

External links
 
 Former website

Sony Pictures Entertainment
Home video companies of the United States
Sony subsidiaries
Companies based in New York City
American companies established in 1992
Home video distributors
Children's mass media
Children's record labels